Group 2 consisted of four of the 32 teams entered into the European zone: Italy, Luxembourg, Switzerland, and Turkey. These four teams competed on a home-and-away basis for one of the 9.5 spots in the final tournament allocated to the European zone, with the group's winner claiming the place in the finals.

Standings

Matches

Notes

External links 
Group 2 Detailed Results at RSSSF

2
1972–73 in Italian football
1973–74 in Italian football
1972–73 in Luxembourgian football
1973–74 in Luxembourgian football
1972–73 in Swiss football
1973–74 in Swiss football
1972–73 in Turkish football
1973–74 in Turkish football